Euseius mundillovalis is a species of mite in the family Phytoseiidae.

References

mundillovalis
Articles created by Qbugbot
Animals described in 1987